The lanthanide contraction is the greater-than-expected decrease in atomic radii/ionic radii of the elements in the lanthanide series from atomic number 57, lanthanum, to 71, lutetium, which results in smaller than otherwise expected atomic radii/ionic radii for the subsequent elements starting with 72, hafnium. The term was coined by the Norwegian geochemist Victor Goldschmidt in his series "Geochemische Verteilungsgesetze der Elemente" (Geochemical distribution laws of the elements).

Cause 
The effect results from poor shielding of nuclear charge (nuclear attractive force on electrons) by 4f electrons; the 6s electrons are drawn towards the nucleus, thus resulting in a smaller atomic radius.

In single-electron atoms, the average separation of an electron from the nucleus is determined by the subshell it belongs to, and decreases with increasing charge on the nucleus; this, in turn, leads to a decrease in atomic radius.  In multi-electron atoms, the decrease in radius brought about by an increase in nuclear charge is partially offset by increasing electrostatic repulsion among electrons. 

In particular, a "shielding effect" operates: i.e., as electrons are added in outer shells, electrons already present shield the outer electrons from nuclear charge, making them experience a lower effective charge on the nucleus. The shielding effect exerted by the inner electrons decreases in the order s > p > d > f. 

Usually, as a particular subshell is filled in a period, the atomic radius decreases. This effect is particularly pronounced in the case of lanthanides, as the 4f subshell which is filled across these elements is not very effective at shielding the outer shell (n=5 and n=6) electrons. Thus the shielding effect is less able to counter the decrease in radius caused by increasing nuclear charge. This leads to "lanthanide contraction". The ionic radius drops from 103 pm for lanthanum(III) to 86.1 pm for lutetium(III).

About 10% of the lanthanide contraction has been attributed to relativistic effects.

Effects

The results of the increased attraction of the outer shell electrons across the lanthanide period may be divided into effects on the lanthanide series itself including the decrease in ionic radii, and influences on the following or post-lanthanide elements.

Properties of the lanthanides
The ionic radii of the lanthanides decrease from 103 pm (La3+) to 86 pm (Lu3+) in the lanthanide series,  as electrons are added to the 4f shell. This first f shell is inside the full 5s and 5p shells (as well as the 6s shell in the neutral atom); the 4f shell is well-localized near the atomic nucleus and has little effect on chemical bonding. The decrease in atomic and ionic radii does affect their chemistry, however. Without the lanthanide contraction, a chemical separation of lanthanides would be extremely difficult. However, this contraction makes the chemical separation of period 5 and period 6 transition metals of the same group rather difficult.

There is a general trend of increasing Vickers hardness, Brinell hardness, density and melting point from lanthanum to lutetium (with europium and ytterbium being the most notable exceptions; in the metallic state, they are divalent rather than trivalent). Lutetium is the hardest and densest lanthanide and has the highest melting point.

Influence on the post-lanthanides

The elements following the lanthanides in the periodic table are influenced by the lanthanide contraction. The radii of the period-6 transition metals are smaller than would be expected if there were no lanthanides, and are in fact very similar to the radii of the period-5 transition metals since the effect of the additional electron shell is almost entirely offset by the lanthanide contraction.

For example, the atomic radius of the metal zirconium, Zr (a period-5 transition element), is 155 pm (empirical value) and that of hafnium, Hf (the corresponding period-6 element), is 159 pm. The ionic radius of Zr4+ is 84 pm and that of Hf4+ is 83 pm. The radii are very similar even though the number of electrons increases from 40 to 72 and the atomic mass increases from 91.22 to 178.49 g/mol. The increase in mass and the unchanged radii lead to a steep increase in density from 6.51 to 13.35 g/cm3.

Zirconium and hafnium, therefore, have very similar chemical behavior, having closely similar radii and electron configurations. Radius-dependent properties such as lattice energies, solvation energies, and stability constants of complexes are also similar. Because of this similarity, hafnium is found only in association with zirconium, which is much more abundant. This also meant that hafnium was discovered as a separate element in 1923, 134 years after zirconium was discovered in 1789. Titanium, on the other hand, is in the same group, but differs enough from those two metals that it is seldom found with them.

See also
d-block contraction (or scandide contraction)

References

External links
 Reference Page, See Figure 2 for details
 Complex Definition

Chemical bonding
Lanthanides
Atomic radius